Dactylopsila is a genus of marsupials in the family Petauridae, native to New Guinea, the Cape York peninsula of Australia, and other close islands. Members of this genus are known as trioks or striped possums, though the latter name is usually used for D. trivirgata.

Species 
The genus includes the following four species:

 Great-tailed triok, Dactylopsila megalura
 Long-fingered triok, Dactylopsila palpator
 Tate's triok, Dactylopsila tatei
 Striped possum, Dactylopsila trivirgata

References

External links 
 
 

Possums
Marsupial genera
Taxa named by John Edward Gray
Taxonomy articles created by Polbot